"Summer Symphony" is a song written by Neil Sedaka and Howard Greenfield. It was arranged by John Farrar and produced by Pat Aulton. The song was used on the album Sounds Of Sedaka, a UK issue of the 1969 album, Workin' On A Groovy Thing recorded for Festival Records of Australia.

As the early 60s came to an end, Neil’s last Hot-100 entry in the decade was “The Answer to My Prayer” in 1965. In 1968 he recorded “Star Crossed Lovers” in Australia and re-energized his career with a #1 hit there. The following year he recorded a full album in Australia with arrangements by John Farrar, who went on to guide the career of Olivia Newton-John.

“Summer Symphony” was a track on the album and was one of seven tracks written with Sedaka’s long-time collaborator, Howard Greenfield. Together they wrote some of his biggest hits, including “Breaking Up Is Hard to Do” in 1962.

A number of tracks from this album were recorded by other artists; “Summer Symphony” was recorded by Lesley Gore on Mercury (1969). It was a non-album single, however, it used as the B-side of Gore's medley hit, "98.6/Lazy Day" (U.S. AC #38).

Jack Gold Sound cover 
"Summer Symphony" was also covered by songwriter and producer Jack Gold in 1970. His rendition reached #10 on the U.S. Easy Listening chart in the summer of 1970. The following summer the song was re-released and became a hit again, reaching #34. It was included on a compilation LP, Make The Music Play (Neil Sedaka's Songwriting Gems 1963-1971).<ref>Various – Make The Music Play (Neil Sedaka's Songwriting Gems 1963-1971)</ref>

 Other versions 
In 1972, The Society of Seven recorded another lyricized version with Tony Ruivivar on lead vocals. It was featured on their LP Simply Ourselves''.

Chart history

References

External links 
 Lyrics of this song

1969 songs
1970 singles
1971 singles
Neil Sedaka songs
Songs written by Neil Sedaka
Songs with lyrics by Howard Greenfield
Lesley Gore songs
Columbia Records singles